Neil Herron (born 1 June 1994) is a Scottish rugby union player at the Centre position.

Herron has represented Scotland at under-17, under-18,  under-20 levels  and on the Scotland 7s.

He played for West of Scotland and Glasgow Hawks. He secured a 7s Elite Development Programme place in 2012 with West of Scotland and secured another EDP placement in 2013 and 2014 with Glasgow Warriors.

The  EDP contract signed allowed Herron to play for Glasgow Hawks if not playing for the Glasgow Warriors.

References

External links 
 Scottish Rugby name new elite development players

1994 births
Living people
Glasgow Warriors players
Male rugby sevens players
Scotland international rugby sevens players
Scottish rugby union players